Monoxenus aethiopicus is a species of beetle in the family Cerambycidae. It was described by Müller in 1941.

References

aethiopicus
Beetles described in 1941